Marek Wolf (born 30 June 1957) is a Czech astronomer, former head the Astronomický ústav, Univerzita Karlova v Praze (Astronomical Institute, Charles University of Prague).

He is a discoverer of several asteroids between 1995 and 2001, mostly in collaboration with Czech astronomers Lenka Kotková and Petr Pravec. The Minor Planet Center credits his discoveries under M. Wolf: he is sometimes confused with Max Wolf (1863–1932), a German astronomer and a very famous asteroid hunter who is credited as M. F. Wolf.

List of discovered minor planets

See also 
 List of minor planet discoverers

References

External links 
 personal home page 
 personal home page 
 curriculum vitæ 

1957 births
20th-century astronomers
Czech astronomers
Discoverers of asteroids
Discoveries by Marek Wolf
Living people